Samir Mane (born 24 December 1967) is an Albanian entrepreneur. He is the founder and President of BALFIN Group, one of the most significant and successful investment groups in the Western Balkans region. The Group's investment portfolio embraces activities of real estate development, retail sales, commercial and industrial space management/services, mining and smelting industry, banking, tourism, customer financing, est. Actually part of Balfin Group are more than 50 companies. Geographically, BALFIN Group is present in Austria, Albania, Kosovo, Bosnia and Herzegovina, North Macedonia, Montenegro and the Netherlands,

Biography
Mane was born in the southern Albanian city of Korça on 24 December 1967. He was a student of the Faculty of Geology and Mining at Tirana University when the communist system in Albania collapsed. As a young student, he migrated to  Austria where mostly worked as a translator while building his personal business network. Whilst living in Austria in 1993, he spotted the opportunity to start business with electronic products and home appliances in Albania. 
In 2008 he was included in the Financial Times top four "people to watch in business" in Albania.

Neptun International
The beginnings of Mane's business activities started in 1993 in Vienna, where Mane founded Alba Trade. Having started with the trade of electronic devices, soon the Balfin Group, created by Mane managed to create the largest network of electronics stores in Albania, Neptun and then extending the network in the neighboring countries as well. Today Neptun is present in Albania, Kosovo and North Macedonia.

Mane TCI
Since 2002 Balfin Group is present in development and real estate management projects. Through the company Mane TCI it has realized industrial and residential facilities of the highest standards in Albania such as Rolling Hills, Ambasador 1, 2, 3, etc, or the well known shopping centers such as TEG or QTU.

QTU, Euromax, Fashion Group
In 2005, it was inaugurated the first shopping center in Albania, Qendra Tregtare Univers (Universe Trade Center). This was a very ambitious project of Mane's for the time and revolutionized the purchasing way of the Albanian customers. a.

The year 2005 marked the establishment of the first Albanian chain of supermarkets, Euromax.

Fashion Group was established in 2005.

TEG
In 2011 Balfin Group completed another important project, Tirana East. it was constructed the most modern and the largest shopping center in Albania with over 90'000 m2.

Skopje City Mall, Honorary Consul of Thailand, Tirana Logistic Park
In October 2012 Balfin Group concluded one of the most important investments of the group abroad, Skopje City Mall.

In March 2012 he was named the honorary consul of Thailand at the opening ceremony of the new consulate.

AlbChrome
In 2013 Balfin Group took a step to diversify the portfolio of activities in the mineral industry by acquiring 100% of the shares of the largest company of extraction, enrichment and processing of chrome in Albania.

Green Coast 
In 2015, Mane started building, Green Coast, containing ten types of buildings, from villas to apartments, including a 5 star hotel.

Spar and Interspar 
In 2016 Mane and Balfin Group turned all the Carrefour in Albania, into Spars and Interspars.

NewCo Ferronikeli and Tirana Bank 
2018 was a successful year for Mane and Balfin Group, where they announced the acquisitions of NewCo Ferronikeli, the integrated nickel mine and smelter based in Drenas, Kosovo. Immediately  after the purchase they injected sufficient funds to restart the plant and bring it back to full production, as well on agreeing to repay the existing supplier debts of the company and paying outstanding salaries. Another major transaction was the acquisition of Tirana Bank in cooperation with Komercijalna Banka from Macedonia, where Balfin Group holds around 90% of the shares.

References

Albanian businesspeople
Living people
1967 births
People from Korçë